The 2021 12 Hours of Sebring (formally known as the 69th Mobil 1 Twelve Hours of Sebring Presented by Advance Auto Parts) was an endurance sports car race  held at Sebring International Raceway near Sebring, Florida from 17 to 20 March 2021. It was the second round of both the 2021 WeatherTech SportsCar Championship and the Michelin Endurance Cup. Mazda Motorsports entered as the defending overall winners of the 12-hour event.

Background

After being postponed to November the previous year due to the COVID-19 pandemic, the race returned to its traditional March date for 2021. Originally, the 1000 Miles of Sebring, the FIA World Endurance Championship event run in conjunction with the 12 Hours in 2019, was slated to return, but was later cancelled due to international travel restrictions still imposed by the pandemic.

On March 10, the full entry list for the race was revealed, featuring 37 cars. The field consisted of 7 cars in the DPi category, 5 in the LMP2 category, 7 in the LMP3 category, 5 in the GTLM category, and 13 in the GTD category.

Supporting the race during the week were IMSA's Michelin Pilot Challenge series, Porsche Carrera Cup North America series, and Mazda MX-5 Cup series.

Results

Race 

References

External links

12 Hours of Sebring
12 Hours of Sebring
12 Hours of Sebring
12 Hours of Sebring